Pennsylvania Route 518 (PA 518) is an  state highway located in Mercer County, Pennsylvania.  The southern terminus is at PA 18 in Hermitage.  The northern terminus is at PA 18 in Hermitage.

Route description

PA 518 begins at an intersection with PA 18 in the city of Hermitage, heading northwest on two-lane undivided Longview Road. The road passes through wooded areas of homes, heading into the city of Farrell and becoming Sharon New Castle Road. In this area, the route heads through more dense residential development and intersects PA 418. PA 518 heads into commercial areas and becomes the border between the city of Sharon to the north and Farrell to the south, with the name of the road becoming Division Street. The route continues past a mix of homes and businesses, and becomes city-maintained after Indiana Avenue. It fully enters Sharon as it turns north onto Stambaugh Avenue. The road is lined with several residences as it comes to an intersection with U.S. Route 62 (US 62). PA 518 passes a mix of residential and commercial establishments as it reaches US 62 Business (US 62 Bus.). At this point, state maintenance resumes and the route turns west to form a concurrency with US 62 Business on East State Street. The road continues west past several businesses along with some homes.

PA 518 splits from US 62 Business in the center of Sharon by heading north on North Sharpsville Avenue. The road passes industrial areas to the west and a mix of residences and businesses to the east. The route makes a curve to the east into residential areas, becoming Thornton Street, prior to turning north onto Hall Avenue. The road passes more homes and runs through a small portion of Hermitage prior to entering the borough of Sharpsville. Here, PA 518 bends to the north-northeast along West Ridge Avenue, eventually curving to the east-northeast. Continuing through residential areas, the route makes a turn north onto South 7th Street before turning east onto West Main Street a block later. Along this road, PA 518 passes a mix of homes and businesses prior to making a turn south onto South Walnut Street. At this point, the road passes more residences, curving to the east. PA 518 crosses back into Hermitage and becomes Lamor Road as it passes through wooded areas of homes, reaching its terminus at another intersection with PA 18.

Major intersections

See also

References

External links

Pennsylvania Highways: PA 518

518
Transportation in Mercer County, Pennsylvania